Oleg Anfimov (1937–2019) was a Soviet engineer and politician who was the minister of electrical equipment industry of the Soviet Union between 1986 and 1991.

Biography
Anfimov was born in Shakhty on 19 February 1937. He was a graduate of the Riga Polytechnical Institute where he obtained a degree in electromechanical engineering. He was a member of the Communist Party. He served in different posts in the party, including the Riga Gorkom Party secretary and secretary of the central committee of the Communist Party of Latvia. He was general director of Riga electro-machinery works from 1981 to 1983. He served as the minister of electrical equipment industry between 20 July 1986 and 24 August 1991. In the period 1986–1989 Anfimov was a deputy at the Supreme Soviet.

In November 1991 Anfimov was appointed president of a state-owned corporation. Then he was made a member of the coordinating council of the Russian Union of Mechanical Engineers. He also served as a member of the advisory council of the Ministry of Industry and Trade of the Russian Federation.

Anfimov died on 9 July 2019.

References

20th-century Russian engineers
21st-century Russian engineers
1937 births
2019 deaths
Communist Party of the Soviet Union members
People from Shakhty
People's commissars and ministers of the Soviet Union
Riga Technical University alumni
Soviet engineers
Members of the Supreme Soviet of Russia